Park Woo-jin (Hangul: 박우진, born November 2, 1999), better known mononymously as Woojin, is a South Korean rapper, singer and songwriter.  He placed sixth in the second season of Produce 101, becoming a member of the project group Wanna One. He is a member of the boy group AB6IX.

Career

Early life and pre-debut 
Park Woo-jin was born in Busan, South Korea. When he was eleven years old, Park Auditioned for survival program called Superstar K. Park graduated from Korean Arts High School in January 2018. Prior to appearing on season two of Produce 101, Park had trained for one year and two months. He initially started as a trainee under JYP Entertainment and then became a trainee under Brand New Music.

2017–2018: Produce 101 and Wanna One

In 2017, Park represented Brand New Music in the boy group reality survival show Produce 101 Season 2. He choreographed the dance to 'Hollywood', which he and his fellow Brand New Music trainees performed at the Produce 101 ranking evaluation.

He is known for finishing at sixth place in the final episode and becoming a member of the project boy group Wanna One under YMC Entertainment.

Park debuted with Wanna One during Wanna One Premier Show-Con on August 7, 2017, at the Gocheok Sky Dome with the debut mini-album 1×1=1 (To Be One).

He promoted with Wanna One's unit "Triple Position", which won the "Best Unit Award" at the 2018 Mnet Asian Music Awards. He concluded his contract with Wanna One on December 31, 2018, although he still appeared with the group until its official farewell concerts on January 24–27, 2019.

2019–present: Solo activities and AB6IX 
In January 2019, Park collaborated with fellow labelmate Lee Dae-hwi and released a single titled "Candle". In March 2019, Park collaborated with American rapper A Boogie wit da Hoodie and released a Korean version of "Look Back at It". In March 2019, Woojin was confirmed as part of the cast for Law of the Jungle in Thailand.

In May 2019, Park debuted in his label Brand New Music's new boy group called AB6IX.

In February 2023, ahead of the official solo release of Park's EP oWn, which was released on February 27, Brand New Music announced that the song "Self-Portrait" (featuring Kim Jae-hwan) would be released on February 15.

Discography

Extended plays

Songs

Filmography

Television show

Notes

References

External links

1999 births
Living people
People from Busan
Produce 101 contestants
South Korean television personalities
South Korean male idols
South Korean male rappers
South Korean dance musicians
South Korean breakdancers
South Korean hip hop dancers
Swing Entertainment artists
21st-century South Korean singers
Reality show winners
Wanna One members
AB6IX members
K-pop singers
Brand New Music artists